Sri Ram Chandra Singh Mahavidyalaya (SRCSM) college is situated at Lohati Saraiya in Rudauli  district Faizabad, Uttar Pradesh. The college is affiliated to Dr. Ram Manohar Lohia Avadh University.

Programmes
The college offers undergraduate i.e. bachelor course under the aegis of its affiliate Dr. Ram Manohar Lohia Avadh University are-
 Bachelor of Science (B.Sc.)
 Bachelor of Arts (B.A)

References

External links

Universities and colleges in Uttar Pradesh
Colleges of Dr. Ram Manohar Lohia Awadh University
Education in Faizabad
Buildings and structures in Faizabad